Little Rock Pond is a small lake northwest of Big Moose in Herkimer County, New York. It drains south via an unnamed creek that flows into Twitchell Creek.

See also
 List of lakes in New York

References 

Lakes of New York (state)
Lakes of Herkimer County, New York